The  is a transport company in Hachiōji, Tokyo, Japan. The company operates a funicular line and a ropeway to Mount Takao, a popular destination for mountain trekking among Tokyo residents. The company was founded on September 29, 1921.

Funicular
The funicular line, commonly known as the  line, is the steepest railway line in Japan, with a 608‰ (31°) elevation at maximum.

Basic data
Distance: 1.0 km / 0.6 mi.
Gauge: 
Stations: 2
Vertical interval: 271 m / 889 ft.

Cars
Two cars are used, both of them made by Hitachi, 1968. They are named Aoba (green leaf) and Momiji (maple leaf), respectively. The cars are connected at opposite ends of the cable, so they move synchronously and counterweight each other.

Services
Cars are operated once every 15 minutes, with the entire ride taking 5 minutes.  Fares are 470 yen one-way and 900 yen return for adults (230/450 yen for children).  Although more expensive per kilometer when compared to other Japanese railway lines (including the shinkansen), fares on the Takao Mountain Railroad funicular compare with those on similar systems such as the Ōyama Cable Car.

Stations
Kiyotaki Station (清滝): 201 m elevation. Transfer to Takaosan-guchi on the Keiō Takao Line (5 minutes walk).
Takaosan Station (高尾山): 472 m elevation.

Ropeway
The ropeway is nicknamed "Echo Lift."

Basic data
Distance: 872 m / 2,861 ft.
Stations: 2
Vertical interval: 237 m / 778 ft.

Stations
Sanroku Station (山麓): 224 m elevation. 5 minutes walk from Takaosan-guchi Station.
Sanjō Station (山上): 462 m elevation.

See also
List of railway companies in Japan
Funicular railway
List of funicular railways

External links
Official website 

Funicular railways in Japan
1067 mm gauge railways in Japan